Ariel was the second book of Sylvia Plath's poetry to be published. It was originally published in 1965, two years after her death by suicide. The poems in the 1965 edition of Ariel, with their free-flowing images and characteristically menacing psychic landscapes, marked a dramatic turn from Plath's earlier Colossus poems.

In the 1965 edition of Ariel, Ted Hughes changed Plath's chosen selection and arrangement by dropping twelve poems, adding twelve composed a few months later and shifting the poems' ordering, in addition to including an introduction by the poet Robert Lowell. Having Lowell write the introduction to the book was appropriate, since, in a BBC interview, Plath cited Lowell's book Life Studies as having had a profound influence over the poetry she was writing in this last phase of her writing career. In the same interview, Plath also cited the poet Anne Sexton as an important influence on her writing during this time since Sexton was also exploring some of the same dark, taboo, personal subject matter that Plath was exploring in her writing.

In 2004, a new edition of Ariel was published which for the first time restored the selection and arrangement of the poems as Plath had left them; the 2004 edition also features a foreword by Plath and Hughes' daughter Frieda Hughes.

Contents (1965 version)
Poems marked with an * were not in Plath's original manuscript, but were added by Ted Hughes. Most of them date from the last few weeks of Plath's life.

Reception
Marjorie Perloff said in her article, "The Two Ariels: The (Re)making Of The Sylvia Plath Canon” that “The fact remains that Plath herself had arranged the future Ariel poems ‘in a careful sequence,’ plotting out every detail including the first and last words of the volume." Another critic remarked that “her poetry would have been valuable no matter what she had written about.” A very accurate description of Plath, considering her form of poetry was notorious for being dark and questionable among her readers.

Awards
 1982 - Pulitzer Prize for Poetry

Analysis
Upon analyzing the collection of poems along with considering her other work, it is concluded that like her other poems, "Ariel" is "highly autobiographical, psychological and confessional poem."

Additional poems in her manuscript
"The Rabbit Catcher"
"Thalidomide"
"Barren Woman"
"A Secret"
"The Jailor"
"The Detective"
"Magi"
"The Other"
"Stopped Dead"
"The Courage of Shutting-Up"
"Purdah"
"Amnesiac"
"Lesbos" (included in US version)

References

External links
Slate.com article about publication of restored Ariel
collection of articles on the new edition
After Ariel: Celebrating the poetry of the women's movement by Honor Moore in the Boston Review
Ariel at the British Library
The Complete working papers for poem 'Sheep In Fog' at the British Library

American poetry collections
1965 poetry books
Books by Sylvia Plath
Faber and Faber books
Books published posthumously
Poems published posthumously